Dick Turpin's Ride to York is a 1922 British historical silent film drama directed by Maurice Elvey and starring Matheson Lang, Isobel Elsom and Cecil Humphreys.  It was the first feature-length film of the story of the famous 18th-century highwayman Dick Turpin and his legendary  overnight ride from London to York on his mount Black Bess.

Dick Turpin's Ride to York was for many years assumed by film historians to be completely lost.  However two reels of the film were among several rediscoveries in a private collection in the United States in 2003.

Cast
 Matheson Lang as Dick Turpin
 Isobel Elsom as Esther Bevis
 Cecil Humphreys as Lytton Glover
 Norman Page as Ferret Bevis
 Lewis Gilbert as Tom King
 Lily Iris as Sally Dutton
 Malcolm Todd as Sir Charles Weston
 Madame d'Esterre as Lady Weston

See also
Hippodrama, a stage play in which live horses feature as characters

References

External links
 
 Dick Turpin's Ride to York at BFI Film & TV Database

1922 films
British silent feature films
British historical drama films
British black-and-white films
Films directed by Maurice Elvey
Films set in the 1730s
Films set in England
Films set in York
1920s historical drama films
Cultural depictions of Dick Turpin
Lost British films
1922 drama films
1922 lost films
1920s English-language films
1920s British films
Silent historical drama films